Bankruptcy Code may refer to:
Bankruptcy in Canada
Bankruptcy in China
Bankruptcy in the United States or Title 11 of the United States Code (aka the "Bankruptcy Code")
Bankruptcy in the United Kingdom
 Insolvency and Bankruptcy Code, an Act made by Parliament of India which governs law related to bankruptcy and insolvency.

See also
 Bankruptcy